The Battle of the Basque Roads was a major naval battle of the Napoleonic Wars, fought in the narrow Basque Roads at the mouth of the Charente River on the Biscay coast of France. The battle, which lasted from 11–25 April 1809, was unusual in that it pitted a hastily-assembled squadron of small and unorthodox British Royal Navy warships, distantly supported by a larger fleet, against the main strength of the French Atlantic Fleet, the circumstances dictated by the cramped, shallow coastal waters in which the battle was fought. The battle is also notorious for its political aftermath in both Britain and France.

In February 1809 the French Atlantic Fleet, based at Brest was ordered to sail to the Caribbean to disrupt a British attack on Martinique. The fleet sailed on 22 February but was unable to escape British pursuit and four days latter anchored in the sheltered position of Basque Roads (or Aix Roads), under the batteries of the fortified Île-d'Aix. A detachment from the British Channel Fleet, commanded by Admiral Lord Gambier, had followed the French to the harbour and there enacted a close blockade. While Gambier debated what action to take, command of the French fleet was awarded to Contre-amiral Zacharie Allemand, who strengthened the fleet's defences and awaited a British attack. In Britain, First Lord of the Admiralty Lord Mulgrave, called on one of the nation's most popular, maverick young naval officers, Captain Lord Cochrane, to prepare an inshore squadron to attack the French.

Cochrane fitted out 24 fireships and explosion vessels and on the night of 11 April led them into the Roads, accompanied by a squadron of small vessels. The fireships caused panic among the French crews, who cut their anchor cables and drifted onto the rocks and shoals of the anchorage. When morning came, Cochrane found that almost the entire French fleet was at his mercy, and signaled to Gambier suggesting that if he would lead the British fleet into the Roads they could destroy the entire French force. Gambier did not respond, and eventually in frustration Cochrane led his own ship directly into combat. Unable to leave his subordinate unsupported, Gambier sent a small squadron of ships of the line to reinforce Cochrane, and on 12 April three French ships of the line, a frigate, and a large storeship were battered into surrender and then set on fire as damaged beyond repair.

Gambier then ordered the reinforcements to withdraw, leaving Cochrane again unsupported against the rest of the main French fleet which was gradually dragging itself off the shoals and into the relative safety of the Charente River. Cochrane renewed his attack on 13 April but was unable to cause any significant damage to the French ships as they threw stores and guns overboard to facilitate their escape. On the morning of 14 April Gambier directly ordered Cochrane to retire, turning command of the operation over to Captain George Wolfe. Cochrane reluctantly complied, and on 15 April sailed back to Britain with dispatches.

Wolfe renewed attacks on the remaining stranded ships of the French fleet over the next week, but with little effect. The battle concluded, Gambier sailed his fleet back to Britain. The engagement was a victory for the British, with five French ships destroyed and several others badly damaged, but there was much discontent in Britain, both among the Navy and the public, that a larger victory had been lost through over-caution. In the aftermath several French captains were subject to courts-martial, and one was shot for cowardice, while in Britain the acrimony between Cochrane and Gambier resulted in a dramatic court-martial of Gambier, in which he was sensationally acquitted.

British fleet
Note that as carronades were not traditionally taken into consideration when calculating a ship's rate, these ships may have been carrying more guns than indicated below.

Inshore Squadron

Gambier's fleet

French fleet
Officers killed in action are marked with a  symbol. Note that as obusiers were not traditionally taken into consideration when calculating a ship's rate, these ships may have been carrying more guns than indicated below.

Notes

References

Bibliography
 
 
 
 
 

Basque Roads
Basque Roads